Aontenaa is a settlement located on Tabuaeran atoll, Kiribati. Paelau is to the north; with Tenenebo to the south.

In the 2010 census 190 people were recorded as living in Aontenaa.

References 

Populated places in Kiribati